Joseph E. Pesce  is an Italian-American astrophysicist and Program Officer at the National Science Foundation in the US. He is a part-time professor at George Mason University and a visiting professor at the University of Colorado, Boulder.

Early life and education 
Pesce received his bachelor's degree (cum laude and with honors) in physics from the University of Colorado, Boulder, and his M.Phil, M.Sc., and Ph.D. degrees in astrophysics from Cambridge University (Peterhouse), UK and the International School for Advanced Studies (SISSA), in Trieste, Italy.

Professional career 
Early in his career, Pesce conducted research into symbiotic binary stars and the atmospheres of late-type (AGB) giant stars at the Center for Astrophysics and Space Astronomy (CU Boulder). At Cambridge and the International School for Advanced Studies he studied the properties of clusters of galaxies and their member galaxies, active galactic nuclei (AGN), their host galaxies and extended environments, and the formation of jets near supermassive black holes.

Pesce held a postdoctoral position at the Space Telescope Science Institute (STScI), in Baltimore, MD, extending his thesis work using high-resolution Hubble Space Telescope (HST) images, and performing large-scale multi-wavelength studies of AGN. He held a Research Associate position at the Pennsylvania State University, in State College, PA, working with high-energy astrophysical data.

Pesce is a Program Officer at the National Science Foundation, Division of Astronomical Sciences. He is responsible for most of the US Federal Government's ground-based radio astronomy facilities.

He is a Fellow of the Royal Astronomical Society, a Fellow of the Cambridge Philosophical Society, a member of the American Astronomical Society, the American Association for the Advancement of Science, the European Astronomical Society, the International Astronomical Union, and the American Physical Society. He is an alumnus of the Presidents Leadership Class at CU, and currently serves on their Board of Directors.  He is a professor at George Mason University in Fairfax, Virginia, and a Visiting Professor at the University of Colorado, Boulder.

In popular culture 
Pesce is a regular guest on The Hill's Rising.  He appears as a commentator and scientific authority on a variety of large-market news and media outlets and for NSF pieces on astrophysics.  He has contributed to podcasts on astronomy, related topics, and science fiction.  He is a science consultant for television, movies, and books.

An expert for Space.com, Pesce conducts AMA sessions and interviews for them.

Awards and honors 
Pesce received the NSF Director's Award for Superior Accomplishment in 2018.  He was nominated for the George Mason University Teaching Excellence Award in 2019 and the Career Connection Faculty Award in 2016.  He is a member of the Cosmos Club in Washington, D.C.

References

External links 
 Personal Homepage
 
 List of Alumni of Peterhouse, Cambridge
  List of University of Cambridge people

Alumni of Peterhouse, Cambridge
University of Colorado faculty
American astronomers
American astrophysicists
Italian astronomers
Italian astrophysicists
Fellows of the Royal Astronomical Society
University of Colorado Boulder alumni
University of Colorado alumni
George Mason University faculty
Living people
Year of birth missing (living people)
20th-century American scientists
21st-century American scientists
20th-century Italian scientists
21st-century Italian scientists